King for a Day... Fool for a Lifetime is the fifth studio album by San Francisco-based band Faith No More, released on March 13, 1995, by Slash and Reprise Records. It was their first album recorded without longtime guitarist Jim Martin. The album showcased a variety of musical genres, with Rolling Stone calling the result a "genre shuffle". King for a Day... Fool for a Lifetime spawned three singles—"Digging the Grave", "Ricochet" and "Evidence".

Following Martin's departure, Trey Spruance was brought on to perform on the album, having also been in Mr. Bungle with singer Mike Patton. Production of the album was further marred by the band suffering a car accident, and the absence of keyboard player Roddy Bottum, who was affected by the deaths of both his father and Kurt Cobain; Courtney Love, Cobain's wife and a former Faith No More vocalist, remains his close friend. Spruance was replaced on the supporting tour by the band's former roadie Dean Menta. However, Spruance played live with Faith No More for the first time in November 2011, playing the entire album during a show in Chile.

Critical reception to the album has been mixed, with its varied genres being cited as a detraction by several reviewers. However, retrospective critique has been more positive and the record has subsequently appeared on several publications' "best of" lists. The album earned the band two Bay Area Music award nominations.

Production

Background

After releasing Angel Dust in 1992, Faith No More's next project was a collaboration with Boo-Yaa T.R.I.B.E., contributing the single "Another Body Murdered" to the soundtrack for the 1993 film Judgment Night. This recording would be the first the band released without guitarist Jim Martin, with bassist Billy Gould recording the guitar parts instead. Martin began skipping practice sessions with the band during the Angel Dust recording sessions, having grown dissatisfied with their new musical directions; he also reportedly stopped writing new music at this time.

Martin was fired from the band later that year due to musical differences, via a fax from keyboard player Roddy Bottum; and Mr. Bungle guitarist Trey Spruance was brought in to record their next album. However, Spruance left the band before the subsequent tour, and was replaced by the band's keyboard roadie, Dean Menta. Reasons given for the change differ—the band claim Spruance was unwilling to commit to a long touring schedule in support of the album, whilst Spruance claims he was never meant to be a permanent member in the first place. In one magazine interview, Gould labelled Spruance as a "spoilt rich kid" who did not want to tour. However, Spruance recalled not even having enough money to buy the magazine where Gould said this about him. He remembered, "This is like one of those stunning juxtapositions in life when you're standing in fucking Tower Records and this thing goes out to the whole world that you're this spoilt, privileged rich kid, and you can't even buy the fucking magazine it's written in. That was really almost like a cosmic moment."

Roddy Bottum claims to have been mostly absent during this period, owing to the deaths of his father and Kurt Cobain, whose wife Courtney Love was a close friend of his and one of the temporary lead singers of the band before Chuck Mosley joined. In addition to this, Bottum had developed a heroin addiction. At one point, his addiction caused a band intervention, following the filming of the video for "Another Body Murdered". Bottum's absence led to the album being written largely without keyboards. Around the recording of the album in 1994, Mike Patton also married Cristina Zuccatosta.

Recording
King for a Day... Fool for a Lifetime was recorded in Bearsville Studios, in Woodstock, New York, making it the first and only Faith No More album not to be recorded in their native Northern California. Gould has described the remote location of the studio as a form of "sensory deprivation". Writing and rehearsing the songs for the album took eight to nine months, although half of this time was also spent finding a replacement for Martin. Recording the album took an additional three months, for which the band hired producer Andy Wallace. Wallace had previously worked with Sonic Youth, Nirvana and Slayer. Bottum claimed the combination of Wallace and Spruance as two new influences helped to create "a real up-in-the-air, what the fuck is gonna happen kind of feel" while recording.

According to singer Mike Patton, the band were involved in a car accident during the recording sessions for the album, while Patton was driving. Spruance and drummer Mike Bordin were also involved, and Patton claimed to have "had to look at a lot of things in the face" as a result. The band used art from the graphic novel Flood by Eric Drooker for the album's cover and those of its singles.

Singles

Before the album's release, the song "Digging the Grave" was released as a single on February 28, 1995. That March, the band appeared on the British television program Top of the Pops to promote the single, later performing it on MTV Europe, Canal+'s Nulle Part Ailleurs and The Jon Stewart Show. The single reached number 16 on the UK Singles Chart, and number 12 on the Australian ARIA Charts. It featured on an episode of Beavis and Butt-head in August 1995, and was included on the soundtrack of the 1996 Italian film Jack Frusciante è uscito dal gruppo. A video for the song was recorded, directed by Marcus Raboy, and filmed in San Francisco. and was later included on the collection Who Cares a Lot?: The Greatest Videos.

"Ricochet" was released as the album's second single on May 1, 1995; and was promoted with an appearance on Late Night with Conan O'Brien. The song peaked at number 27 on the UK charts and number 58 in Australia. The song was also included on the soundtrack to the 1996 PlayStation game Fox Hunt. A video for "Ricochet" was filmed in Paris and directed by Alex Hemmings. It does not appear on the video collection, Who Cares a Lot?: The Greatest Videos.

The album's third and final single was "Evidence", released on May 8, 1995. The band made an appearance the previous month on the Australian variety show Hey Hey It's Saturday to perform the song, which eventually peaked at number 32 in the UK and number 27 in Australia. A video was made for the song, directed by Walter A. Stern.

Other songs
A total of twenty tracks were recorded for the album, with only fourteen making the final listing. Cut tracks "I Won't Forget You" and "Hippie Jam Song" both appeared on the later compilations Who Cares a Lot? and The Very Best Definitive Ultimate Greatest Hits Collection; whilst covers of "I Started a Joke" and "Greenfields" were included as B-sides to the single "Digging the Grave"; and covers of "I Wanna Fuck Myself" and "Spanish Eyes" were both included as B-sides to the singles "Ricochet" and "Evidence".

"Just a Man" was influenced by Chinese classical music, Patton's vocal track being based on the style of Anthony Newley. "Star A.D." makes an appearance on the 2008 compilation The Works. When asked if the song was a reference to Kurt Cobain, Mike Patton stated "God no! It's about a phenomenon. And if that guy happened to be one, I don't know. It's one of those things that happen; it's a Vegas thing. What could be more shameful than having to change your colostomy bag on stage?! Vegas is great, though. I love it. Welcome to America". The song "What a Day" includes the line "Kill the body and the head will die", which was taken from Hunter S. Thompson's 1971 book Fear and Loathing in Las Vegas. In a late 1994 interview, Bottum described the penultimate track "The Last to Know" as "Pearl Jam on mushrooms".

Reception

Unlike Faith No More's previous albums, initial reception to King for a Day... Fool for a Lifetime was mixed. Entertainment Weekly gave the album a grade of C− and called it an "archaic progressive-rock fusion, oddly out of step with the times". Al Weisel of Rolling Stone gave it a rating of two stars out of five, saying "one hopes that that last song's moving chorus – 'Don't let me die with this silly look in my eyes' – doesn't prove to be Faith No More's epitaph". Metal Hammer acknowledges that the album was met with "crushing disappointment", but praised its diversity. Michael Snyder of the San Francisco Chronicle, however, was more favorable, calling it "an utter triumph", adding that it was "enigmatic, sarcastic, provocative and incisive". Spin magazine's Jonathan Gold rated the album 6 out of 10, praising its "deftness" and its "burnished, jackhammer-sheathed-in-a-lubricated-condom presence", but feeling that its multiple genres were a distraction.

Writing for AllMusic, Greg Prato gave it a more positive rating of three-and-a-half stars out of five, while calling it one of the band's "underrated releases". Prato also pointed out the breadth of genres covered by the album's songs. This variety was also described as a "genre shuffle" by a Rolling Stone biography of the band. New York magazine described the album as "baroquely, nightmarishly weird", praising Mike Patton's vocals. Writing for the Los Angeles Daily News, Bruce Warren rated the album two-and-a-half stars out of four, writing that the band "sounds more accomplished than ever", and singling Bottum's keyboards out as particularly noteworthy. Anthony Violanti of The Buffalo News gave the album a rating of three-and-a-half stars out of five, noting that "Patton still acts wild but has matured as a singer", and describing "Digging the Grave" as a "power pop masterpiece".

Legacy and accolades
King for a Day... Fool for a Lifetime was nominated for a Bay Area Music Award in 1995, in the category "Hard Music Album or EP". Bassist Billy Gould also received a nomination for Best Bassist at the same event. However, neither nomination was won; Gould lost out to Les Claypool of Primus, while the album itself was beaten by Green Day's Insomniac.

Two years after it was released, Gould said "I'm proud of that record. I think the biggest criticism that it gets is that it didn't sell. It's really ironic. If you judge a record by that kind of logic, then the Ford Taurus would be the greatest car ever made in the history of mankind because it's the highest-selling car ever sold". In 2005, Germany's Visions magazine ranked King for a Day... Fool for a Lifetime 37 in their list of "150 Albums for Eternity"  and in 2014, it placed fourth on the Alternative Nation site's "Top 10 Underrated 90s Alternative Rock Albums" list. In 2016, Metal Hammer included it on their "10 essential alt-metal albums" list. In 2015, Spin described the album as having "a more streamlined version of the sound that Incubus would soon take to the headlining stadium slot that Faith No More only encircled."

Release history
King for a Day... Fool for a Lifetime was pre-released as a limited-edition two-record vinyl album, limited to 10,000 copies, two weeks before the album went on general sale. It was also released in a limited run of 7 x 7 inch records packaged in a hard card box, with bonus tracks and audio interviews with all the band members included. In November 2011, Faith No More reunited with Trey Spruance for a performance at the Maquinaria festival, during which the album was played in its entirety.

Track listing

7×7″ box set track listing

Personnel

Faith No More

Charts

Weekly charts

Year-end charts

Singles

Certifications

References

Faith No More albums
1995 albums
Albums produced by Andy Wallace (producer)
Slash Records albums